Grand Duke Vyacheslav Konstantinovich of Russia, (13 July 1862 – 27 February 1879), was a Romanov grand duke and the youngest son of Grand Duke Konstantin Nikolayevich of Russia and his wife Princess Alexandra of Saxe-Altenburg. The English form of his first name is Wenceslas.

Biography
Vyacheslav, who was nicknamed "Slava," was the baby of the family and a family favorite. He was tall and used to joke that, when he is dead, his coffin would be stuck in a doorway of the Marble Palace. It really happened so when he died. At age sixteen, he complained suddenly of a splitting headache and violent illness. He lay with a Russian Orthodox icon on his pillow as his family surrounded him, urging him to breathe. He died within a week of brain inflammation. His mother later reported that she had seen the ghost of a white lady in the art gallery at Pavlovsk on the day before Vyacheslav became ill. She took the apparition as a portent of death. His brother Grand Duke Constantine Constantinovich of Russia later recalled, as he walked in Vyacheslav's funeral procession, how much Vyacheslav enjoyed drawing funeral processions in great detail.

Orders and decorations
 : Grand Cross of the Württemberg Crown, 1874

Ancestry

Notes

References
Pchelov, E.V. (2003). The Romanovs: history of the dynasty. Archive. Moscow, OLMA-PRESS. 
Zeepvat, Charlotte (2004). The Camera and the Tsars. Sutton Publishing. 

1862 births
1879 deaths
Nobility from Warsaw
People from Warsaw Governorate
Russian grand dukes
House of Holstein-Gottorp-Romanov
19th-century people from the Russian Empire
Burials at Saints Peter and Paul Cathedral, Saint Petersburg